Temo Kasarashvili is a retired Soviet Greco-Roman-style wrestler. Kasarashvili received medals in several USSR and international championships. He began his career in 1972 and retired in 1984.

Sport results 
 1978 Junior Europe wrestling Championship - ;
 1979 Junior World wrestling Championship - ;
 1981 USSR Greco-Roman wrestling Championship - ;
 1982 USSR Greco-Roman wrestling Championship - ;
 1983 USSR Greco-Roman wrestling Championship - ;
 1983 Greco-Roman wrestling at Spartakiad of Peoples of the USSR - ;
 1984 USSR Greco-Roman wrestling Championship - ;

Links 
 

World Wrestling Championships medalists
Soviet male sport wrestlers
Male sport wrestlers from Georgia (country)
Living people
1959 births
Medalists at the 1981 Summer Universiade